Bulu may refer to:

 Bulu (bread) (or Bolo), a sweet, round bread of Sephardi Jewish origin
 Bulu (Fijian mythology), the underworld in the mythology of Fiji
 A subgroup of the Beti-Pahuin people of Cameroon
 Bulu language, spoken by the Bulu people of Cameroon
 Bulu, Zimbabwe, found in Matabeleland South, Zimbabwe
 Bulu, Rembang, on Indonesian National Route 1 in Central Java, Indonesia
 Bulu, Sukoharjo, part of Sukoharjo Regency in Central Java, Indonesia
 Bulu, Temanggung, on Indonesian National Route 9 in Central Java, Indonesia
 Tapu Bulu, a Pokémon species introduced in Pokémon Sun and Moon